Fear-Bound is a 1925 American silent Western film directed by William Nigh and starring Marjorie Daw, William Nigh, and Niles Welch.

Plot
As described in a review in a film magazine, deserted by her shiftless husband and three sons, Ma Tumble (Mackintosh) works the little farm and raises her infant daughter Falfi. Fifteen years later Falfi (Daw) meets a stranger who proves to be the youngest son Jim (Nigh). Falfi pleads so with Ma that she lets him stay. The arrival of the sheriff finds Jim crazed with fear as he had aided his father and brothers in a bank robbery. A soldier appears and tells the family that Jim died in France a hero in the war. To escape the law, the family moves to another state and Falfi opens a restaurant. All goes well until Pa (Roseman) and the brothers appear. The soldier Tod (Welch), now a mine owner, gets Jim a job as a guard at the mine and, though afraid, he accepts. When money for the mine is to be transported, his shiftless father makes him change uniforms with his brother and they go to rob the money wagon. Jim, cowering in fear, binds himself to his bed. Ma discovers him and the deception, and Jim admits he always was a coward and says he hid in France so as to be captured. He slinkds away from the house and meets his father and brothers. The youngest taunts him about being yellow, and Jim suddenly finds himself and fights them all. When the youngest brother starts to help, they subdue the others. Jim is once again proclaimed a hero and Tod decides to marry Falfi.

Cast

Preservation
With no prints of Fear-Bound located in any film archives, it is a lost film.

References

External links

 

1925 films
1925 Western (genre) films
American black-and-white films
Films directed by William Nigh
Vitagraph Studios films
Silent American Western (genre) films
1920s English-language films
1920s American films